Philip Sprint (born 27 June 1993) is a German footballer who plays as a goalkeeper for Hertha BSC II.

Career
Sprint made his professional debut for Hertha BSC on 12 August 2012, in a 2. Bundesliga match against FSV Frankfurt, coming on in the 50th minute for Marvin Knoll, after starting goalkeeper Sascha Burchert had been sent off.

External links 
 
 

1993 births
Living people
Footballers from Berlin
German footballers
Association football goalkeepers
Hertha BSC players
Hertha BSC II players
Alemannia Aachen players
FC Viktoria 1889 Berlin players
2. Bundesliga players
3. Liga players
Regionalliga players